The Roman Catholic Diocese of Surigao (Lat: Dioecesis Surigensis) is a diocese of the Latin Church of the Roman Catholic Church in the Philippines.

Erected in 1939, the diocese is one of the older ecclesiastical territories in the Philippines. The diocese was split off from the Archdiocese of Cagayan de Oro. In 1978, the diocese was subdivided, and the Diocese of Tandag was split off.

The diocese is a suffragan of the Archdiocese of Cagayan de Oro.

The current bishop is Antonieto Dumagan Cabajog who was appointed on July 24, 2001.

The jurisdiction of this diocese are the two provinces of Surigao del Norte and Dinagat Islands

Coat of Arms

These arms show in the chief a star for Saint Nicholas of Tolentiono, the patron saint of the diocese. The three golden balls are Spanish doubloons and refer to the richness of the area, as there have been some gold mines in the diocese. Thebase shows a fishing boat, referring to the main source of income for the area.

Ordinaries

See also
Catholic Church in the Philippines

References

External links
 
 Diocese of Surigao

Surigao
Surigao
Christian organizations established in 1939
Roman Catholic dioceses and prelatures established in the 20th century
1939 establishments in the Philippines
Religion in Surigao del Norte
Surigao City